This is a list of all personnel changes for the 1956 NBA off-season and 1956–57 NBA season.

Events

July 23, 1956
 The Rochester Royals signed Lew Hitch as a free agent.

August 31, 1956
 The Boston Celtics claimed Andy Phillip on waivers from the Fort Wayne Pistons.

September 11, 1956
 The St. Louis Hawks signed Irv Bemoras as a free agent.

October 3, 1956
 The Syracuse Nationals sold Billy Kenville to the Fort Wayne Pistons.

October 23, 1956
 The Syracuse Nationals sold Red Rocha to the Fort Wayne Pistons.

October 24, 1956
 The Minneapolis Lakers sold Al Bianchi to the Syracuse Nationals.

October 26, 1956
 The New York Knicks traded Walter Dukes and Burdette Haldorson to the Minneapolis Lakers for Jerry Bird, Phil Jordon and Slater Martin.

November 15, 1956
 The Syracuse Nationals signed Larry Hennessy as a free agent.
 The Syracuse Nationals signed Bob Schafer as a free agent.
 The St. Louis Hawks claimed Odie Spears on waivers from the Fort Wayne Pistons.

November 29, 1956
 The Boston Celtics sold Togo Palazzi to the Syracuse Nationals.

December 2, 1956
 The St. Louis Hawks sold Bob Harrison to the Syracuse Nationals.

December 12, 1956
 The St. Louis Hawks traded Willie Naulls to the New York Knicks for Slater Martin.
 The Fort Wayne Pistons released Alex Hannum.

December 17, 1956
 The St. Louis Hawks signed Alex Hannum as a free agent.

January 4, 1957
 The Rochester Royals sold Lew Hitch to the Philadelphia Warriors.

January 7, 1957
 The St. Louis Hawks fired Red Holzman as head coach.

January 8, 1957
 The St. Louis Hawks appointed Slater Martin as head coach.

January 21, 1957
 The St. Louis Hawks hired Alex Hannum as head coach.

April 3, 1957
 The New York Knicks traded Dick Atha, Nathaniel Clifton and Harry Gallatin to the Fort Wayne Pistons for Mel Hutchins and Charlie Tyra.
 The New York Knicks traded Dick McGuire to the Fort Wayne Pistons for a 1958 1st round draft pick (Mike Farmer was later selected).

April 17, 1957
 The Minneapolis Lakers traded Clyde Lovellette and Jim Paxson to the Rochester Royals for Bob Burrow, Ed Fleming, Hot Rod Hundley, Monk Meineke and Art Spoelstra.

May 14, 1957
 The Fort Wayne Pistons traded Corky Devlin to the Minneapolis Lakers for Ed Kalafat.

June 19, 1957
 The Minneapolis Lakers reassigned Head Coach John Kundla.
 The Minneapolis Lakers hired George Mikan as head coach.

Notes
 Number of years played in the NBA prior to the draft
 Career with the franchise that drafted the player
 Never played a game for the franchise

External links
NBA Transactions at NBA.com
1956-57 NBA Transactions| Basketball-Reference.com

References

Transactions
1956-57